Thomas Tertius Paget JP, DL (27 December 1807 – 16 October 1892) was an English banker and Liberal Party politician.

Paget was the eldest son of the banker and Whig politician Thomas Paget (1778–1862) and his wife Anne Pares. He was a partner in Leicester Bank and became a J. P. and a Deputy Lieutenant  for Leicestershire and High Sheriff of Leicestershire in 1869.

Paget was elected as a Member of Parliament (MP) for the Southern Division of Leicestershire at a by-election in November 1867, filling the vacancy caused by the death of the Conservative Party MP Charles William Packe. However, he was defeated at the 1868 general election, and was unsuccessful both at a further by-election in 1870 and at the 1874 general election. He finally regained the seat, after a twelve-year absence from the House of Commons, at the  1880 general election, and when the constituency was abolished under the Redistribution of Seats Act 1885, he was elected 
at the 1885 general election for the new Harborough Division of Leicestershire. He retired from Parliament at the 1886 general election.

Paget died at the age of 84, having married Katharine Geraldine MacCausland, daughter of Marcus MacCausland of Dreenagh, County Londonderry, in 1850.

References

External links 
 

1807 births
1892 deaths
Liberal Party (UK) MPs for English constituencies
UK MPs 1865–1868
UK MPs 1880–1885
UK MPs 1885–1886
Deputy Lieutenants of Leicestershire
High Sheriffs of Leicestershire